Tyutnevo is a rural locality (a village) in Yaganovskoye Rural Settlement, Cherepovetsky District, Vologda Oblast, Russia. The population was 16 as of 2002.

Geography 
Tyutnevo is located 37 km northeast of Cherepovets (the district's administrative centre) by road. Lenino is the nearest rural locality.

References 

Rural localities in Cherepovetsky District